is a Welsh television magazine and chat show programme. Broadcast live on S4C weeknights at 7:00 pm, it features topical stories and studio guests. Various reporters also assist with subject-specific presenting, both in the studio and on location, or through filmed segments. Its afternoon sister programme is called .

Background
 was first broadcast on S4C on Monday 17 September 1990, made by production company Agenda (which became Tinopolis) in Swansea. It was replaced by a similar programme, in January 2002.

 returned on 1 March 2012, after Tinopolis won a £5.1 million contract. The show is broadcast from Tinopolis's Llanelli studio. In May 2012, they re-opened their studio in Caernarfon (which they had recently closed) following complaints that the programme was too Llanelli-based. The Caernarfon studio created content about North and Mid-Wales.

Format
In its original run,  was broadcast at 6pm each weekday but since its return it is shown between 7pm and 7:30pm on Mondays to Fridays. Broadcasts are live, with a variety of guests chatting with the presenters in the Llanelli studio. Several reporters provide short items of interest from around Wales.

Presenters
It was originally presented by Angharad Mair, Sian Thomas, Iestyn Garlick and Glynog Davies (now a producer of the programme). Mair and Thomas are still (2015) regular presenters.

References

External links
 
 
Welsh television news shows
Television shows set in Wales
S4C original programming
Tinopolis
1990 British television series debuts
2002 British television series endings
2012 British television series debuts
1990s British television series
2000s British television series
2010s British television series
1990s Welsh television series
2000s Welsh television series
2010s Welsh television series
Live television series